There are several lists of Macedonians, people who live or lived in the region of Macedonia:
List of Macedonians (modern ethnic group)
List of Macedonians (Greek)
List of Macedonian Bulgarians
List of ancient Macedonians
List of Macedonian Americans

See also
Macedonia (disambiguation)
Macedonia (terminology)